Atlético Clube Goianiense, usually known as Atlético Goianiense or just as Atlético, is a Brazilian football team from the city of Goiânia, capital city of the Brazilian state of Goiás. Atlético Goianiense is the oldest Goiânia city football club. The club is the first team of its state to win a national competition, which was the Série C. Atlético Goianiense made a comeback to Brazil's top level Série A in 2010 after a 23-year absence. In 2016, Atlético Goianiense won the title of the Campeonato Brasileiro Série B for the first time. They won the title with two rounds in advance, beating the already relegated Tupi by 5 to 3.

History

On 2 April 1937, Nicanor Gordo and Joaquim Veiga founded the club, starting football in the newly founded city of Goiânia. Gordo and Veiga left the newly founded club in 1938, and joined Goiânia EC, which was another new club.

In 1944, the club competed in the first Campeonato Goiano, which was also the first official football championship in the state, and was contested between five clubs from Goiânia. The other teams were Goiânia, Vila Nova, Goiás and Campinas. Atlético Goianiense won the competition, being its first title. In 1957, the club won the state championship without losing a match, also winning the Torneio dos Invictos, played in the same year.

In 1971, the team won the Torneio da Integração Nacional, beating Ponte Preta in the final. In 1990, after defeating América Mineiro in the penalty shootout, Atlético Goianiense won the Campeonato Brasileiro Série C.

In 2003, Atlético Goianiense finished in the state championship's last place, and was relegated to the following year's second division. In 2005, the club won the Goiás State Championship Second Division, being promoted to the following year's First Division. In 2006, the club finished in second place in the Goiás State Championship First Level, and they won the league in 2010 and in 2011. The club competed in the Copa Sudamericana in 2012.

The club's greatest achievement was in 2016, when they won the Campeonato Brasileiro Série B.

Honours
Série B: 1
2016

Série C: 2
1990, 2008

Campeonato Goiano: 16
1944, 1947, 1949, 1955, 1957, 1964, 1970, 1985, 1988, 2007, 2010, 2011, 2014, 2019, 2020, 2022

Torneio da Integração Nacional: 1
1971

Campeonato Goiano Second Division: 1
2005

Stadium

The club plays its home matches at Estádio Antônio Accioly, which has a maximum capacity of approximately 12,000 people. Instead the club has plans to make his own modern arena for more than 15,000 to replace Antônio Accioly Stadium.

Atlético Goianiense's training center is called CT Urias Magalhães. Atlético Goianiense has another training ground for youth players at the city of Aparecida de Goiânia.

Club's colors

The club's colors are red and black. It is composed of a red and black horizontal striped shirt, white short and red and black horizontal striped socks.

Symbols and anthem
Atlético Goianiense's mascot is a red dragon symbolizing the club. The club is nicknamed Dragão, meaning Dragon. The flag is similar to the club's home kit, with red and black horizontal stripes, and the logo in the center.

Atlético's official anthem was composed by Joaquim Jayme, however, there is another, non-official, anthem.

Current squad

First team squad

Reserve team

Out on loan

First-team staff

Head coaches

 Arthur Neto (2006–2007)
 Edson Gaúcho (2007)
 Flávio Lopes (2007–2008)
 Zé Teodoro (Feb 2008 – Dec 2008)
 Mauro Fernandes (May 2008–2009)
 Paulo César Gusmão (2009)
 Mauro Fernandes (2009)
 Arthur Neto (2009–2010)
 Geninho (2010)
 Roberto Fernandes (2010)
 René Simões (2010–2011)
 Paulo César Gusmão (2011)
 Jairo Araújo (interim) (2011)
 Hélio dos Anjos (Aug 2011–2012)
 Jairo Araújo (interim) (2012)
 Adílson Batista (2012)
 Hélio dos Anjos (2012)
 Jairo Araújo (interim) (2012)
 Arthur Neto (2012)
 Jairo Araújo (2012–2013)
 Waldemar Lemos (2013)
 René Simões (2013)
 Paulo César Gusmão (2013)
 Gilberto Pereira (2013)
 Marcelo Martelotte (2014)
 Hélio dos Anjos (2014)
 Wagner Lopes (2014)
 Marcelo Chamusca (2015)
 João Paulo Sanches (interim) (2015)
 Marcelo Martelotte (2015)
 Gilberto Pereira (interim) (2015)
 Jorginho (2015)
 Gilberto Pereira (2015)
 Wagner Lopes (2016)
 Marcelo Cabo (2016–2017)
 Doriva (2017)
 João Paulo Sanches (2017–2018)
 Wagner Lopes (2018–2019)
 Eduardo Barroca (2019)

References
Enciclopédia do Futebol Brasileiro, Volume 1 – Lance, Rio de Janeiro: Aretê Editorial S/A, 2001.

External links

 Official website
 Arquivo de Clubes

 
Association football clubs established in 1937
Football clubs in Goiás
1937 establishments in Brazil